Constant Bucher (born 6 February 1900, date of death unknown) was a Swiss athlete. He competed in the men's decathlon at the 1920 Summer Olympics and the 1924 Summer Olympics.

References

External links
 

1900 births
Year of death missing
Athletes (track and field) at the 1920 Summer Olympics
Athletes (track and field) at the 1924 Summer Olympics
Swiss decathletes
Olympic athletes of Switzerland
Place of birth missing
Olympic decathletes